Tumble or tumbling may refer to:

Arts and media
 Tumble (album), a 1989 album by Biota
 Tumble (TV series), a British TV series
 Tumble (video game), a 2010 Sony Interactive Entertainment video game
 "Tumble", a song by Meghan Trainor from the album Only 17
 Mr Tumble, a character on Something Special

Other uses
 Tumbling (gymnastics), a gymnastic sport
 Tumble, Carmarthenshire, a village in South Wales
 Tumble RFC, a rugby union club
 A special case of Poinsot's ellipsoid, describing a form of chaotic rotation of an extended object

See also
 Tumble finishing, a technique for smoothing and polishing the surface on small parts
 Tumbler (disambiguation)